Santa Teresa is a suburb of Rivera, the capital city of the Rivera Department of northeastern Uruguay.

Geography
The suburb is located on Avenida Italia, southwest of the city and northwest of the suburb Mandubí. The stream Arroyo Sauzal flows along the western limits of the suburb.

Population
In 2011 Santa Teresa had a population of 2,657.
 
Source: Instituto Nacional de Estadística de Uruguay

References

External links
INE map of Rivera, Santa Teresa, Mandubí and Lagunón

Populated places in the Rivera Department